Prime Time is a 2021 Polish drama thriller film co-written and directed by Jakub Piątek in his directorial debut. The film stars Bartosz Bielenia, Magdalena Popławska, Andrzej Kłak, Małgorzata Hajewska-Krzysztofik, Dobromir Dymecki, and Monika Frajczyk.

The film had its world premiere at the 2021 Sundance Film Festival on January 30, 2021.

Cast
The cast include:
 Bartosz Bielenia as Sebastian
 Magdalena Popławska as Mira Kryle
 Andrzej Kłak as Grzegorz
 Małgorzata Hajewska-Krzysztofik as Laura
 Dobromir Dymecki as Commander
 Monika Frajczyk as Lena
Adam Nawojczyk as Station Chairman
Juliusz Chrzastowski as Sebastian Father
Pola Blasik as Kasia

Release
The film had its world premiere at the 2021 Sundance Film Festival on January 30, 2021 in the World Cinema Dramatic Competition section.

Reception
The review aggregator website Rotten Tomatoes surveyed  and, categorizing the reviews as positive or negative, assessed 9 as positive and 7 as negative for a 56% rating. Among the reviews, it determined an average rating of 5.4 out of 10.

References

External links
 
 

2021 films
2021 thriller drama films
2021 independent films
Polish thriller drama films
Polish independent films
2020s Polish-language films